The House is a weekly political magazine relating to the British Houses of Parliament, published by Dod's Parliamentary Communications.

History and profile
It was founded in 1976 by MPs including Mike Thomas, Richard Faulkner and Patrick Cormack. It is published weekly when Parliament is sitting, and offers interviews with politicians, news, opinion, analysis and coverage from both the House of Commons and the House of Lords. 

As of March 2022, The House magazine and sister outlet Politics Home had a combined monthly readership of up to one million. 

Current personnel are listed on the magazine's Web site.

References

External links
Official webpage

1976 establishments in the United Kingdom
Political magazines published in the United Kingdom
Weekly magazines published in the United Kingdom
House of Commons of the United Kingdom
Magazines published in London
Magazines established in 1976